Raúl Vicente Amarilla Romero (born 12 June 1988, in Asunción), also known as Raúl Amarilla, is a football striker from Paraguay and son of former star player Raúl Vicente Amarilla.

Amarilla started his career in the youth divisions of Olimpia and made his professional debut in the first team squad in 2007 at the age of 19.

For the 2009 season, Amarilla moved on loan to Écija Balompié of Spain. In the 2011 season, he moved to CD Atlético Baleares.

References

External links
 
 

1988 births
Living people
Paraguayan footballers
Paraguayan people of Spanish descent
Cádiz CF B players
Club Olimpia footballers
CD Atlético Baleares footballers
Paraguayan expatriate footballers
Expatriate footballers in Spain
Paraguayan expatriate sportspeople in Spain
Association football forwards